Pedorthic Association of Canada (PAC) is a national non-profit organization whose mandate is to develop and promote the study, practice and knowledge of Pedorthics in Canada. Currently the Pedorthic Association of Canada has almost 600 members nationwide.  The association headquarters is located in Winnipeg, Manitoba.

The Pedorthic Association of Canada's membership consists of Certified members, who hold professional designations through The College of Pedorthics of Canada, as well as industry professionals. Certified members can hold designations of Certified Pedorthist (Canada), Certified Pedorthic Technician (Canada) or Certified Master Craftsman (Canada). All certified members must complete post graduate courses in the Diploma in Pedorthics program offered across Canada through Western University.

Canadian Certified Pedorthists are orthotic and footwear experts. Pedorthists (C. Ped (C)) are one of the few healthcare professionals trained in the assessment of lower limb anatomy and biomechanics. With specialized education and training in the design, manufacture, fit and modification of foot orthotics and footwear, Pedorthists help to alleviate pain, abnormalities and debilitating conditions of the lower limbs and feet that if left untreated could result in limited mobility.

References

External links 
 
 The College of Pedorthics of Canada

Medical and health organizations based in Manitoba
Podiatry organizations